The New American Standard Bible (NASB) is a translation of the Bible in contemporary English. Published by the Lockman Foundation, the complete NASB was released in 1971. The NASB relies on recently published critical editions of the original Hebrew, Aramaic, and Greek texts.

The Lockman Foundation claims that the NASB "has been widely embraced as a literal and accurate English translation because it consistently uses the formal equivalence translation philosophy."

Translation philosophy 
The New American Standard Bible is considered by some sources as the most literally translated of major 20th-century English Bible translations. According to the NASB's preface, the translators had a "Fourfold Aim" in this work:
 These publications shall be true to the original Hebrew, Aramaic, and Greek.
 They shall be grammatically correct.
 They shall be understandable.
 They shall give the Lord Jesus Christ His proper place, the place which the Word gives Him; therefore, no work will ever be personalized.

The NASB is an original translation from the Hebrew, Aramaic, and Greek texts, based on the same principles of translation, and wording, as the American Standard Version (ASV) of 1901. It offers an alternative to the Revised Standard Version (1946–1952/1971), which is considered by some to be theologically liberal, and also to the 1929 revision of the ASV. 

The Hebrew text used for this translation was the third edition of Rudolf Kittel's Biblia Hebraica as well as the Dead Sea Scrolls. The Biblia Hebraica Stuttgartensia was consulted for the 1995 revision. For Greek, Eberhard Nestle's Novum Testamentum Graece was used; the 23rd edition in the 1971 original, and the 26th in the 1995 revision.

Seeing the need for a literal, modern translation of the English Bible, the translators sought to produce a contemporary English Bible while maintaining a word-for-word translation style. In cases where word-for-word literalness was determined to be unacceptable for modern readers, changes were made in the direction of more current idioms. In some such instances, the more literal renderings were indicated in footnotes.

The NASB claims to be reliable and faithful to the original languages. It  includes printing of verses as individual units (although more recent editions are available in paragraph format).

YHWH 
YHWH (rendered as "Jehovah" in the original ASV/A.S.V.) is rendered LORD or GOD in capital letters in the NASB. The committee stated the reason as:

This is in direct contrast to the preface of ASV of 70 years earlier, where the committee explained that "the American Revisers...were brought to the unanimous conviction that a Jewish superstition, which regarded the Divine Name as too sacred to be uttered, ought no longer to dominate in the English or any other version of the Old Testament."

Revisions 
The Lockman Foundation published NASB text, modifications, and revisions in the following order:
 Gospel of John (1960)
 The Gospels (1962)
 New Testament (1963)
 Psalms (1968)
 Complete Bible (Old Testament and New Testament; 1971)
 Minor text modifications (1972, 1973, 1975)
 Major text revisions (1977, 1995, 2020)

1995 revision 
In 1992, the Lockman Foundation commissioned a limited revision of the NASB. In 1995, the Lockman Foundation reissued the NASB text as the NASB Updated Edition (more commonly, the Updated NASB or NASB95). Since then, it has become widely known as simply the "NASB", supplanting the 1977 text in current printings, save for a few (Thompson Chain Reference Bibles, Open Bibles, Key Word Study Bibles, et al.).

In the updated NASB, consideration was given to the latest available manuscripts with an emphasis on determining the best Greek text. Primarily, the 26th edition of Nestle-Aland's Novum Testamentum Graece is closely followed. The Biblia Hebraica Stuttgartensia is also employed together with the most recent information from lexicography, cognate languages, and the Dead Sea Scrolls.

The updated NASB represents recommended revisions and refinements, and states that it incorporates thorough research based on current English usage. Vocabulary, grammar, and sentence structure were meticulously revised for greater understanding and smoother reading, hence increasing clarity and readability. Terms found in Elizabethan English such as "thy" and "thou" have been modernized, while verses with difficult word ordering are restructured. Punctuation and paragraphing have been formatted for modernization, and verbs with multiple meanings have been updated to better account for their contextual usage.

2020 revision 
Starting in 2018, the Lockman Foundation posted some passages from "NASB 2020", an update of the 1995 revision. Key differences from the 1995 revision include an effort to improve "gender accuracy" (for example, adding "or sisters" in italics to passages that reference "brothers", to help convey the mixed-gender meaning of a passage that might otherwise be misunderstood as only speaking of men), a shift (where applicable) from the common construct "let us" when proposing action to the more-contemporary construct "let's" (to disambiguate a sort of "imperative" encouragement rather than a seeking of permission that could otherwise be misunderstood from a given passage), and a repositioning of some "bracketed text" (that is, verses or portions of verses that are not present in earliest Biblical manuscripts, and thus printed in brackets in previous NASB editions) out from inline-and-in-brackets down instead to footnotes.

Translators 
The translation work was done by a group sponsored by the Lockman Foundation. According to the Lockman Foundation, the committee consisted of people from Christian institutions of higher learning and from evangelical Protestant, predominantly conservative, denominations (Presbyterian, Methodist, Southern Baptist, Church of Christ, Nazarene, American Baptist, Fundamentalist, Conservative Baptist, Free Methodist, Congregational, Disciples of Christ, Evangelical Free, Independent Baptist, Independent Mennonite, Assembly of God, North American Baptist, and "other religious groups").

The foundation's Web site indicates that among the translators and consultants who contributed are Bible scholars with doctorates in biblical languages, theology, "or other advanced degrees", and come from a variety of denominational backgrounds.  More than 20 individuals worked on modernizing the NASB in accord with the most recent research.

See also 
 Modern English Bible translations

Notes

References

Further reading 
 Marlowe, Michael D. (October 2002). "New American Standard Bible". Retrieved March 19, 2005.
 The Lockman Foundation (1995). "Preface to the New American Standard Bible". Retrieved March 19, 2005.
 The Lockman Foundation. "New American Standard Bible". Retrieved April 13, 2006.
 The Lockman Foundation. "Translation Principles". Retrieved April 13, 2006.
 Ryken, Leland (2002). The Word of God in English. Wheaton, IL: Crossway.

External links 
 Official webpage

1971 books
1971 in Christianity
Bible translations into English